Ora Belle Washington (c. 1899 – December 21, 1971) was an American athlete from the Germantown neighborhood of Philadelphia, Pennsylvania. Washington excelled in both tennis and basketball, and she was inducted into the Women's Basketball Hall of Fame in 2009 and the Naismith Memorial Basketball Hall of Fame in 2018. Black newspapers referred to her as "Queen Ora" and the "Queen of Two Courts." According to Arthur Ashe, she may have been one of best tennis players of all time.

Early life
Washington was born in Virginia around 1899 to James Thomas Washington and Laura Young Washington. The exact date of her birth is unknown. After the American Civil War, the state of Virginia was in debt and to save money did not issue birth certificates from 1896 to 1912. The fifth of nine children, she grew up in the farming community of File located in Caroline County, Virginia. The Washingtons owned their farm, where they raised pigs and grew wheat, corn, and vegetables. While they fared better than sharecroppers in the area, the Washingtons struggled in the poor economy. In 1908, Laura Washington died in childbirth adding further strain to the family's finances. By 1910, the family farm had been mortgaged and James Washington had been unemployed for a number of months. Like other African Americans during the Great Migration, the Washingtons moved north in the mid 1910s looking for better economic opportunities.

Ora's aunt, Mattie Washington, was the first of the family to migrate, marry, and settle in Germantown. Once she was established, she invited Ora and her sisters to visit. Ora traveled to Germantown in the mid-1910s, and may have attended high school there. By 1920, census records indicate she was a live-in servant in town there.

Career

Tennis 
Shortly after her older sister, Georgia, died of tuberculosis, Washington found a home away from home at the YWCA that had opened in 1918 to serve black members of the Germantown neighborhood. Washington began playing tennis on the courts there in the early 1920s. In 1924, she went on to win the Wilmington, Delaware, city championships in singles, doubles, and mixed doubles. The following year, she defeated the reigning national African American singles champion Isadore Channels. She won her first national title in 1925 with Lula Ballard at national doubles tournament of the all-Black American Tennis Association, which she would continue to win for the next eleven years. After moving to Chicago in 1929, Washington won her first singles championship that same year when she defeated Frances Gittens in three sets. She would win the title seven more times by 1937.

On the tennis court, Washington's presence loomed larger to her opponents than her ,  frame. Biographers have noted that she favored an unconventional tennis playing style. A right-hander, she held the racket in the middle of the grip, "choking up" like a baseball player on a bat. She also preferred brief warmup sessions before matches, saying, "I'd rather play from scratch and warm up as I went along." Opponents and fans described Washington as a strategic and physically strong player, noting her intimidating competitiveness and overhead play. Tennis great Arthur Ashe credited her foot speed, honed during her basketball play, as one of her greatest strengths on the court.

In the spring of 1938, Washington announced that she planned to retire from singles tennis play. Because she was still dominating the competition, and actively playing doubles and mixed doubles, some questioned her decision. In an interview in the Baltimore Afro-American in the summer of 1939, she explained, "It does not pay to be national champion too long. It's the struggle to be one that counts. Once arrived everybody wants to take it away from you and you are the object of many criticisms." Washington remained focused and professional about her work on the courts and relatively quiet and "plain" off the courts. Her blue-collar, rural style may have contributed to her lower visibility among the black elite tennis community.

Following Washington's singles retirement, Flora Lomax of Detroit, Michigan, won the singles title in 1938. In contrast to Washington, Lomax quickly earned a reputation as "the glamour girl of tennis", for her strong fashion sense and friendship with icons such as Joe Louis. With Lomax's 1938 victory, the press generated a rivalry between the two players, with some claiming that Washington had retired so she wouldn't have to face Lomax. Those speculations were enough to draw Washington out of retirement. The next summer, she signed up for a tournament in Buffalo, New York, where she disposed of Lomax in three sets, 6-2, 1-6, 6-2. Washington did not mince words when interviewed about her brief return: "Certain people said certain things last year. They said Ora was not so good any more. I had not planned to enter singles this year, but I just had to go up to Buffalo to prove somebody was wrong."

Basketball 
Despite a desire to play in United States Lawn Tennis Association tournaments, that organization maintained its policy of racial segregation until 1948, after Washington had retired from tennis. Washington retired completely from sport in the mid-1940s, after she and partner George Stewart defeated Walter Johnson and upcoming superstar Althea Gibson to win the 1947 ATA mixed doubles title. Johnson was later quoted as saying, "Ora would have beaten Althea if she hadn't retired."

She played basketball first in 1930 with the Germantown Hornets, and their 22–1 record earned her the national female title. The Hornets were originally sponsored by the same Germantown YWCA that introduced Washington to tennis. As the team gained popularity, they separated from the YWCA and became fully professional. The following year, Washington led the Hornets to thirty-three consecutive victories. Their opponents included African American women's teams, white women's teams and, occasionally, African American men's teams. In one game against the male Quicksteppers in January 1932, they stayed close and, on a last second basket by Evelyn Mann, the Hornets emerged victorious.

Later, playing with the Philadelphia Tribune Girls from 1932–1942, she was the team's center, leading scorer, and coach. Washington played for the Tribunes in a three-game event against Bennett College in 1934. The Tribunes won all three games, the second of which was described by the Chicago Defender as "the greatest exhibition ever staged in North Carolina". The Tribune Girls won 11 straight Women's Colored Basketball World's Championships. Washington was said to be "the best Colored player in the world."

Later Life 
During her athletic career and for the remainder of her life, she supported herself as a housekeeper. Washington never married. Over the years, she lived with family members and female friends. After a long illness, she died in 1971. She was buried in her Virginia hometown.

Honors and tributes
In the mid-1980s, she was inducted to Temple University's Sports Hall of Fame.

A state historical marker stands at 6128 Germantown Avenue, Philadelphia, the location of the Colored YWCA where she taught and played, now home to Settlement Music School.

In 2009, Washington was elected to the Women's Basketball Hall of Fame, located in Knoxville, Tennessee.

On March 31, 2018, it was announced she was being inducted as part of the Basketball Hall of Fame class of 2018.

On July 31, 2019, a statue inspired by Washington, titled "MVP", was added to Smith Playground in Philadelphia's Fairmount Park.

See also
Basketball in the United States
Germantown, Philadelphia
Women's tennis in the United States

References

Further reading

Grundy, Pamela (2006). "Ora Washington: The First Black Female Athletic Star," in Wiggins, David K. (editor) Out of the Shadows: A Biographical History of African American Athletes. University of Arkansas Press.
BBC podcast series on Ora Washington. https://www.youtube.com/watch?v=WMcQnZbwSos

1890s births
1971 deaths
African-American female tennis players
African-American sportswomen
American female tennis players
American women's basketball players
Basketball players from Philadelphia
Naismith Memorial Basketball Hall of Fame inductees
Tennis players from Philadelphia
20th-century African-American women
20th-century African-American sportspeople